Nazaré is a neighborhood in the city of Salvador, Bahia, Brazil. The region of present-day Nazaré was chiefly rural until the 19th century. It developed below the Historic Center of the city around the freguesias, or historical settlements of São Pedro, Santana do Sacramento, and later, Nossa Senhora de Brotas. Avenida Joana Angélica, a broad avenue, crosses the neighborhood from north-east to south-west. The avenue is named for Joana Angélica, a Brazilian Conceptionist nun and martyr of Brazilian Independence. Joana Angélica was stabbed by a bayonet at the Convent of Lapa by Portuguese colonial troops. Nazaré is home to numerous historic structures of the city; it is additionally home of several government and academic centers.

Districts
Saúde
Tororó
Jardim Baiano

Historic structures

Church of the Blessed Sacrament of Saint Anne
Academy of Letters of Bahia (Solar dos Calmons)
Asilo dos Expostos
Asilo Santa Izabel
Casa do Barão do Rio Real
Church and Convent of Our Lady of the Conception of Lapa
Church and Convent of Our Lady of the Exile
Church of Our Lady of Health and Glory
Church of Our Lady of the Palm
Church of Santo Antônio da Mouraria
Fonte do Gravatá
Hospital Santa Izabel
House at Avenida Joana Angélica no. 149
House at Rua do Genipapeiro no. 65
House at Rua do Gravatá no. 55
House at Rua Felipe Camarão no. 34

References

Neighbourhoods in Salvador, Bahia